An Jea-Won (born 24 April 1948) is a Korean former wrestler who competed in the 1972 Summer Olympics.

References

External links
 

1948 births
Living people
Olympic wrestlers of South Korea
Wrestlers at the 1972 Summer Olympics
South Korean male sport wrestlers
Asian Games medalists in wrestling
Wrestlers at the 1970 Asian Games
Asian Games silver medalists for South Korea
Medalists at the 1970 Asian Games
20th-century South Korean people